Glenn Michibata (born 13 June 1962) is a former professional tennis player and former head coach of the Princeton University Tigers tennis team.

Playing career

Collegiate career
Before turning pro, Michibata was an All-American player at Pepperdine University in the 1981, 1982 and 1983 seasons.

Professional career – singles
An ATP touring professional from 1983 to 1993, Michibata earned a career-high singles ranking of World No. 48 in April 1986.  His best results were the semifinals at the 1985 outdoor Tokyo, 1989 Wellington, and 1989 Schenectady Grand Prix events.

Michibata reached the second round in all four Grand Slam tournaments, but never further. His first Grand Slam appearance was at the 1983 US Open, when he lost in the second round to Pat Cash. His last was also at the US Open in 1991, when he lost in the first round to Nuno Marques. Michibata only played all four Grand Slams in the same year in 1989, reaching the second round at the French Open and US Open and losing in the first round at the Australian Open  and Wimbledon.

Professional career – doubles
Michibata had more success as a doubles player. Much of this success came with fellow Canadian Grant Connell, including four titles. In 1990, Michibata and Connell were finalists at the Australian Open. Michibata's highest doubles ranking was #5 on 8 July 1991 after he and Connell reached the semifinals of both the French Open and Wimbledon. Coincidentally, they lost both of these semifinals to John Fitzgerald and Anders Järryd.

Davis Cup and Olympics
Michibata competed for 14 Canadian Davis Cup teams between 1982 and 1992. He went 4 and 10 in singles and 7 and 8 in doubles. The Connell-Michibata pair won a crucial match in a 1990 tie  against the Dutchmen Paul Haarhuis and Mark Koevermans 7–6(5), 7–6(5), 6–2, as Canada defeated the Netherlands 3–2 in the qualifying round for the 1991 World Group. Unfortunately the Canadian team as well as the Connell-Michibata pairing lost in the first round of the World Group in 1991 as well as the following year, two of the only three times Canada has competed in the World Group since its inception in 1981.

Michibata also competed in Men's Doubles with Grant Connell at the 1988 Olympics in Seoul. They were seeded 6th, but lost in the first round to Moreten Christensen and Michael Tauson of Denmark.

Coaching career
After retiring as a player, Michibata became the director of tennis at Whistler Racquet and Golf Resort in Whistler, British Columbia. Also, Michibata coached the doubles team of fellow Canadian Daniel Nestor and Mark Knowles for two years (1995–1997).

In 1997, Michibata became an assistant tennis coach at the University of Southern California, staying there until 2000, when he moved to Princeton University to become the head coach of its tennis program. He remained at Princeton for 12 years during which time he had a 145–121 record, including winning records in seven Ivy League seasons, and three Ivy League Players of the Year.

Michibata has remained in the Princeton area, and he is currently director of elite and tournament training for the Princeton Tennis Program, where he coaches many nationally ranked players.

Personal life
Michibata is married and has a son and a daughter. In 1999, he was inducted into both the Canadian Tennis Hall of Fame in 1999. and the Etobicoke Sports Hall of Fame. Michibata and Grant Connell were inducted into the Rogers Cup Hall of Fame in 2010.

ATP career finals

Doubles: 27 (4 titles, 23 runner-ups)

Performance timelines

Singles

Doubles

Mixed Doubles

References

External links
 
 
 
Etobicoke Sports Hall of Fame Inductee '99 Video for Michibata

1962 births
Living people
Canadian expatriate sportspeople in the United States
Canadian male tennis players
Canadian tennis coaches
People from West Windsor, New Jersey
Pepperdine Waves men's tennis players
Princeton Tigers men's tennis coaches
Tennis players from Toronto
Canadian sportspeople of Japanese descent